The Athabasca rainbow trout is a localized variety of the rainbow trout (Oncorhynchus mykiss), a fish in the family Salmonidae. It is found in the headwaters of the Athabasca river in Alberta, Canada. The Athabasca rainbow trout was considered as a form of the Columbia River redband trout  subspecies in the trout handbook of Robert J. Behnke (1992), but considered a separate, yet unnamed subspecies by L. M. Carl of the Ontario Ministry of Resources in work published in 1994. The Athabasca River is a tributary of the Mackenzie River system which flows north into the Arctic Ocean.

The Athabasca rainbow trout is one of the few native rainbow trout populations found in an Arctic Ocean watershed. Populations of either coastal rainbow trout (O. m. irideus) or Columbia River redband trout (O. m. gairdneri) exist in Peace and Liard river tributaries in the Mackenzie River system.

The Athabasca rainbow is considered a "May be at risk" species in Alberta due to potential habitat loss and hybridization with introduced rainbow trout".

References

Oncorhynchus
Trout, Athabasca rainbow
Fish of Canada
Endemic fauna of Canada
Fauna of the Rocky Mountains
Natural history of Alberta
Forma taxa
Subspecies